Kid Cuisine is an American brand of packaged frozen meals, marketed by Conagra Foods, created in 1990. Described as a "frozen food version of a Happy Meal", the product is marketed towards children, while assuring parents of nutritional benefits. The mascot of the brand is a penguin named K.C., while the former was a different penguin named B.J. and a polar bear named "The Chef".

Nutrition and marketing techniques
Kid Cuisine is what its own marketing agency in the 2000s described as a "kid-driven request item", that is, children would ask their parents to buy these items. Advertisements for Kid Cuisine were consciously aimed at the child, which was urged to request their mothers to buy these items, especially in the upper range of the 3-10 year old range the brand aimed at.

The foods sold under the brand often have what Bettina Elias Siegel, author of Kid Food, called "nutritionally questionable combos", including "cheeseburgers or mac and cheese served with corn and gummy candy, chicken nuggets served with French fries and pudding", etc. By 2010, such foods were increasingly questioned as the obesity epidemic took center stage, and Conagra developed a new marketing technique to keep convincing mothers to buy these products for their children. With the slogan "The more you know, the less you 'no'", they attempted to convince mothers that Kid Cuisine did actually provide nutritional foods that mothers would not have to say "no" to. But "good reasons" to say "yes" were, according to Siegel, very weak, and included assurances about some of the meals containing minerals and vitamins, and "minor nutritional tweaks" like using whole grain flour for the breading of chicken nuggets. In addition, the brand changed its mascots, ran an ad campaign aimed directly at children, which included games where children could sign up and win prizes. 20,000 children signed up online in 17 days, and many came back again and again to play branded games. The dual strategy that, according to Siegel, is at work here, targets parents and children: parents' "nutritional vigilance" is eroded, while children are encouraged to demand unhealthy products.

Kid Cuisine relies on advertising with TV and movie characters, including The Avengers, Frozen, and SpongeBob SquarePants; the company also had a "Hello Kitty" chicken nugget dinner.

Most of them can have three or four foods, including some with desserts like cakes, smoothies, cookies, brownies, and pudding, which has color-changing sprinkles. The other foods included are burgers, french fries, tacos, hot dogs, corn dogs, chicken nuggets and drumsticks, macaroni and cheese, fish sticks, pizza, vegetables such as corn, fruit snacks, spaghetti, and occasionally breakfast foods like pancakes, sausages, berry toppings and tater tots as well as fruit cups.

Between April 26, 2022 and June 11, 2022, Kid Cuisine changed their logo and mascot to a simpler logo, and K.C. is now  a more realistic penguin rather then the cartoon.

Meals
Kid Cuisine Meals that are still being produced.

All-Star Nuggets

Popcorn Chicken

Mini Corn Dogs

References

External links 
 

Conagra Brands brands
Frozen food brands
Fictional penguins
Products introduced in 1989
Food for children